The Massachusetts Community College Athletic Association (also known as the MCCAA) is a sports association in the NJCAA for junior colleges located in Massachusetts, Connecticut and Rhode Island.  The conference is a member of the Region 21 of NJCAA. Conference championships are held in most sports and individuals can be named to All-Conference and All-Academic teams.

Members
Bristol Community College 
Bunker Hill Community College 
Community College of Rhode Island 
Gateway Community College (CT) 
Holyoke Community College 
Massasoit Community College 
Mass Bay Community College 
Northern Essex Community College
Quincy College 
Quinsigamond Community College 
Roxbury Community College 
Springfield Technical Community College 
University of Connecticut at Avery Point

Former Members
Benjamin Franklin Institute of Technology

See also
National Junior College Athletic Association (NJCAA)

External links
NJCAA Region 21 website
NJCAA Website

1970 establishments in Massachusetts
College sports in Massachusetts
Community colleges in Massachusetts
NJCAA conferences